With This Ring may refer to:

With This Ring (1925 film), an American silent film directed by Fred Windemere
With This Ring (1978 film)
With This Ring (2015 film)
With This Ring (TV series), 1951
"With This Ring" (The Platters song)
With This Ring (novel), a 1941 mystery novel by Mignon G. Eberhart